Elizabeth Powell may refer to:

 Elizabeth Powell (colonist) (fl. 1836), early settler of Texas
 Elizabeth Powell (pianist), classical pianist
 Elizabeth Powell (poet), American poet
 Elizabeth Powell (scientist), Australian scientist
 Elizabeth Dilys Powell (1901–1995), English journalist
 Elizabeth Powell, lead singer and guitarist of the band Land of Talk

See also
 Elizabeth Willing Powel (1743–1830), American socialite